Mikhail Ivanovich Burtsev (21 June 1956 – 16 October 2015) was a Soviet sabre fencer. He won two gold medals and two silvers at three different Olympic Games.

Career
Burtsev began his fencing career in 1965; he originally fenced for Burevstnik, and later for CSKA Moscow.  Burtsev was a graduate of the Russian State University of Physical Education, Sport, Youth and Tourism. He was named a Merited Master of Sport of the USSR (Заслуженный мастер спорта) in 1980.

Burtsev was one of the youngest Olympic fencing champions, being only 20 years old when he won his first gold medal in Canada in 1976. Burtsev was unable to compete at the 1984 Summer Olympics because of the Soviet boycott of those games, but went on to win the silver medal in men's team sabre in the 1988 Summer Olympics. At the 1992 Summer Olympics, he coached the Unified Team fielded by the former Soviet Union, which took the gold medal at men's team sabre.

Honours

Individual
Silver medal at the World Championships (1978)
Bronze medal at the World Championships (1979)
Silver medal at the Olympic Games (1980)
Gold medal at the Friendship Games (1984)
Merited Master of Sport of the USSR (1980)

Team
Six-time world champion (1977, 1979, 1983, 1985, 1986, 1987)
Silver medal at the World Championships (1978, 1981)
Bronze medal at the World Championships (1982)
Gold medal at the Olympic Games (1976, 1980)
Silver medal at the Olympic Games (1988)
Gold medal at the Friendship Games (1984)

References

External links

1956 births
2015 deaths
Soviet male fencers
Russian male fencers
Olympic fencers of the Soviet Union
Fencers at the 1976 Summer Olympics
Fencers at the 1980 Summer Olympics
Fencers at the 1988 Summer Olympics
Honoured Masters of Sport of the USSR
Olympic gold medalists for the Soviet Union
Olympic silver medalists for the Soviet Union
Olympic medalists in fencing
Martial artists from Moscow
Medalists at the 1976 Summer Olympics
Medalists at the 1980 Summer Olympics
Medalists at the 1988 Summer Olympics
Universiade medalists in fencing
Burials in Troyekurovskoye Cemetery
Universiade silver medalists for the Soviet Union
Medalists at the 1979 Summer Universiade